.gs is the Internet country code top-level domain (ccTLD) for South Georgia and the South Sandwich Islands.

.gs is a member of CoCCA, a group of country-code domains making use of common registry and/or dispute resolution services.

.gs is a common domain for URL shortening services or general URL shortening. Examples of use include:

 brook.gs (Brookings Institution)
 redwn.gs (Detroit Red Wings)
 lakin.gs (Los Angeles Kings)
 goza.gs (Gonzaga Bulldogs)
 gado.gs (Georgia Bulldogs)
 hvd.gs (The Harvard Gazette)
 whtp.gs (Whitepages Australia)
 brd.gs (Bord Gáis Energy)
 eurowin.gs (Eurowings)
 coralsprin.gs (Coral Springs, Florida)

External links 
 IANA .gs WhoIs information
 Complaint form
 Official government website of the South Georgia and the South Sandwich Islands

Computer-related introductions in 1997
Country code top-level domains
Economy of South Georgia and the South Sandwich Islands

sv:Toppdomän#G